The presidential standard or presidential flag is the flag that is used in many countries as a symbol of the head of state or president. In some countries it may be for exclusive use of the president or only raised where the president is present. An equivalent in a monarchy is a royal standard, and in an empire, an imperial standard.

Presidential Standard of Abkhazia
Presidential Standard of Albania
Presidential Standard of Algeria
Presidential Standard of Angola
Presidential Standard of Argentina
Presidential Standard of Armenia
Presidential Standard of Austria
Presidential Standard of Azerbaijan
Presidential Standard of Bangladesh
Presidential Standard of Barbados
Presidential Standard of Belarus
Presidential Standard of Botswana
Presidential Standard of Brazil
Presidential Standard of Burkina Faso
Presidential Standard of Chile
Presidential Standard of the Democratic Republic of the Congo
Presidential Standard of Colombia
Presidential Standard of Croatia
Presidential Standard of Cuba
Presidential Standard of Northern Cyprus
Presidential Standard of Cyprus
Presidential Standard of the Czech Republic
Presidential Standard of Dominica
Presidential Standard of Ecuador
Presidential Standard of Egypt
Presidential Standard of Eritrea
Presidential Standard of Estonia
Presidential Standard of Fiji
Presidential Standard of Finland
Presidential Standard of France
Presidential Standard of Gabon
Presidential Standard of Gambia
Presidential Standard of Georgia
Presidential Standard of Germany
Presidential Standard of Ghana
Presidential Standard of Greece
Presidential Standard of Guatemala
Presidential Standard of Guinea
Presidential Standard of Guyana
Presidential Standard of Hungary
Presidential Standard of Haiti
Presidential Standard of Iceland
Presidential Standard of India
Presidential Standard of Indonesia
Presidential Standard of Ireland
Presidential Standard of Israel
Presidential Standard of Italy
Presidential Standard of Kazakhstan
Presidential Standard of Kenya
Presidential Standard of Kosovo
Presidential Standard of Kyrgyzstan
Presidential Standard of Latvia
Presidential Standard of Liberia
Presidential Standard of Lithuania
Presidential Standard of North Macedonia
Presidential Standard of Madagascar
Presidential Standard of Malawi
Presidential Standard of the Maldives
Presidential Standard of Malta
Presidential Standard of Mauritania
Presidential Standard of Mauritius
Presidential Standard of Mexico
Presidential Standard of Moldova
Presidential Standard of Montenegro
Presidential Standard of Mozambique
Presidential Standard of Namibia
Presidential Standard of Nigeria
Presidential Standard of Pakistan
Presidential Standard of Palau
Presidential Standard of Palestine
Presidential Standard of Panama
Presidential Standard of Paraguay
Presidential Standard of Peru
Presidential Standard of the Philippines
Presidential Standard of Poland
Presidential Standard of Portugal
Presidential Standard of Romania
Presidential Standard of Russia
Presidential Standard of Rwanda
Presidential Standard of Serbia
Presidential Standard of Seychelles
Presidential Standard of Sierra Leone
Presidential Standard of Singapore
Presidential Standard of Slovakia
Presidential Standard of Slovenia
Presidential Standard of Somaliland
Presidential Standard of South Africa
Presidential Standard of South Korea
Presidential Standard of South Sudan
Presidential Standard of Sri Lanka
Presidential Standard of Srpska
Presidential Standard of Sudan
Presidential Standard of Suriname
Presidential Standard of Taiwan, Republic of China
Presidential Standard of Tanzania
Presidential Standard of Tajikistan
Presidential Standard of Togo
Presidential Standard of Transnistria
Presidential Standard of Trinidad and Tobago
Presidential Standard of Tunisia
Presidential Standard of Turkey
Presidential Standard of Turkmenistan
Presidential Standard of Uganda
Presidential Standard of Ukraine
Presidential Standard of the United Arab Emirates (the President of United Arab Emirates is a monarch)
Presidential Standard of the United States
Presidential Standard of Uzbekistan
Presidential Standard of Vanuatu
Presidential Standard of Venezuela
Presidential Standard of Zambia
Presidential Standard of Zimbabwe

Former presidential standards 
Presidential Standard of Czechoslovakia (1918–1939, 1945–1992)
Presidential Standard of the German Democratic Republic (1955–1990)
Presidential Standard of the Spanish Republic (1931–1939)
Presidential Standard of the Republic of Vietnam (1955–1963)
Presidential Standard of Yugoslavia (1949–1992)
Presidential Standard of the State of East Indonesia (1947–1950)

See also
Heraldic standard
Gallery of head of state standards

Notes

Standard
Standards (flags)